Mister Fred's Round Pegs and Bass Peeps is an all-star musical ensemble led by New Orleans writer and performer P.H. (PH) Fred, who is best known for the Dr. Demento tune “Kill Barney” and his tenure with BROWN! Improv alongside Ken Jeong. The group's debut CD, Lithium and Underoos, is a folk opera loosely based on Fred's battles with manic depression post-Katrina.

Mister Fred's Round Pegs and Bass Peeps also features guitarist Steve Hunter and bassist Fernando Saunders, both Lou Reed alumni. Other Bass Peeps include Jimmy Messa (The Subdudes), George Porter Jr. (The Meters), and Mike Watt (Minutemen, Firehose, The Stooges).

A live version of the band performs in New Orleans under the abbreviated name The Round Pegs.

The band is currently finishing up its second full-length CD N.O.Americana. Hunter, Saunders, and Watt are all involved in the project.

Discography
 Lithium and Underoos (2010) – Notthat Records
 "Emo Emu" (single, 2012) – Notthat Records
 Pack Up Your Bags: The 99¢ E.P. (2013) – Notthat Records
 Miss You E.P. (2014) - Notthat Records
 N.O. Americana (2014) - Notthat Records

PH Fred (solo)
 Kill Barney & Other Delights (1995)- Candy Jack Records
 Dirty Martini (2001) - Candyjack/OTB
 Adventure of Blue Tarp and Black Mold (2006)  - Notthat Records
 Menagerie: 50 Years of Fred (2014) - Notthat Records/OTB Joint

References 

Musical groups from New Orleans